Venerable Jeftimije of Dečani also Jeftimije Dečanski (Serbian: преподобни Јефтимије Дечански; 16th century) was a Serbian monk who became a martyr after the Ottomans invaded Medieval Serbia in the 16th century and he died a martyr's death.

Jeftimije of Dečani is celebrated on 24 November (New Style) and 11 November (Old Style) according to the calendar of the Serbian Orthodox Church.

See also
 List of Serbian saints

References 

Date of death missing
Year of birth missing
Serbian saints of the Eastern Orthodox Church